"I Feel Good" is a song by American rapper Pitbull featuring producers Anthony Watts and DJWS. It was released on August 20, 2021, via Mr. 305 Records.

Composition
The song is written in the key of G♭ major, with a tempo of 125 beats per minute.

Charts

Weekly charts

Year-end charts

Release history

References

2021 songs
2021 singles
Pitbull (rapper) songs
Songs written by Pitbull (rapper)